The Sound of Music (An Unfinished Symphony in 12 Parts) is a studio album by Jad Fair and Kramer. It was released in 1999 through Shimmy Disc.

Critical reception
SF Weekly wrote that "ace musician Kramer offers a particularly sweet backdrop for Jad's zany lyrics."

Track listing

Personnel 
Adapted from The Sound of Music (An Unfinished Symphony in 12 Parts) liner notes.
Jad Fair – vocals, instruments
Kramer – instruments, production, engineering

Release history

References

External links 
 The Sound of Music (An Unfinished Symphony in 12 Parts) at Discogs (list of releases)

1999 albums
Collaborative albums
Albums produced by Kramer (musician)
Jad Fair albums
Kramer (musician) albums
Shimmy Disc albums